The following is a list of ambassadors of Bulgaria to the Russian Empire, Soviet Union and the Russian Federation:

Russian Empire

 Konstantin Stoilov - Diplomatic Agent in Saint Petersburg – 1883
 Dimiter Stancioff - Diplomatic Agent in Saint Petersburg – 1897–1906
 Stefan Paprikov - Diplomatic Agent in Saint Petersburg – 1906; Minister Plenipotentiary in Saint Petersburg 1910–1912
 Dimiter Tsokov - Diplomatic Agent and Minister Plenipotentiary in Saint Petersburg 1908–1909
 Stefan Bobchev - Minister Plenipotentiary in Saint Petersburg 1912–1913
 Radko Dimitriev - Minister Plenipotentiary in Saint Petersburg 1913–1914
 Michail Madjarov - Minister Plenipotentiary in Saint Petersburg 1914–1915

Soviet Union

 Stefan Chaprashikov - Minister Plenipotentiary in Soviet Russia 1918
 Nikola Antonov - Minister Plenipotentiary in Moscow 1936-1939
 Todor Christov - Minister Plenipotentiary in Moscow 1940
 Ivan Stamenov - Minister Plenipotentiary in Moscow 1940-1941
 Dimiter Mihalchev - Minister Plenipotentiary in Moscow 1934-1936 ; Political Representative and Minister Plenipotentiary in Moscow 1944-1946
 Nayden Kourdalanov - Minister Plenipotentiary in Moscow 1946 ; Ambassador to the USSR 1948-1949
 Stella Blagoeva - Ambassador to the USSR 1949-1954
 Karlo Lukanov - Ambassador to the USSR 1954-1956
 Lyuben Nikolov - Ambassador to the USSR 1956-1963
 Stoyan Karadjov - Ambassador in Moscow 1963-1967
 Stoyan Ivanov - Ambassador in Moscow 1967-1973
 Dimiter Zhulev - Ambassador in Moscow 1973-1986
 Georgi Pankov - Ambassador Extraordinary and Plenipotentiary in Moscow 1986-1990
 Vladimir Velchev - Ambassador in the USSR and the Russian Federation 1991-1992

Russian Federation

 Vladimir Velchev - Ambassador in the USSR and the Russian Federation 1991-1992
 Volodya Neykov - Minister Plenipotentiary in Moscow 1992-1994
 Hristo Miladinov - Ambassador in the Russian Federation 1994-1997
 Vassiliy Takev - Ambassador in Moscow 1997-2000
 Ilian Vassilev - Ambassador Extraordinary and Plenipotentiary in Moscow 2000-2006
 Plamen Grozdanov - Ambassador in Moscow 2006-2012
  George Gergov - Ambassador in Moscow 2006-2019

References

 
Bulgaria
Russia